The 1990 season of the Paraguayan Primera División, the top category of Paraguayan football, was played by 12 teams. The national champions were Cerro Porteño.

Results

First stage

Third-place play-offs

Second stage

Second-place play-offs

Third stage

Group A

First-place play-offs

Group B

Fourth stage

Group A

Group B

Semifinal play-offs

Final play-offs

Play-offs for Copa Libertadores)

External links
Paraguay 1990 season at RSSSF

Para
Paraguayan Primera División seasons
1